The 1971–72 FC Bayern Munich season was the club's seventh season in Bundesliga.

Team kit

Match results

Legend

Bundesliga

League fixtures and results

League table

DFB-Pokal

UEFA Cup Winners' Cup

References

FC Bayern Munich seasons
Bayern
German football championship-winning seasons